Snowballers Entertainment is an American record label and entertainment company based in New York City founded by the award winning music video director, Ray Kay, and the Norwegian music producer Axident. The record label develops artists with an emphasis on pop, urban and dance music.

Signed artists

 Slimmie Hendrix
 Tokyo Diiva

See also
 Slimmie Hendrix
 Ray Kay

References

 Ray Kay starts his own record label (February 8, 2011) "". Online hip-hop magazine. Retrieved on February 9, 2011.
 Ray Kay starts his own record label (February 9, 2011) "". Online news site. Retrieved on February 9, 2011.
 Snowballers Entertainment (February 9, 2011). "". Snowballers Entertainment official site. Retrieved on February 9, 2011

External links 
 

American record labels
Record labels established in 2011
Entertainment companies established in 2011